Blackwood is a 2013 horror-thriller film written by J. S. Hill and directed by Adam Wimpenny. It stars Ed Stoppard, Sophia Myles and Russell Tovey. The film premiered at the 2013 London Film Festival and was released on 1 August 2014.

Synopsis
Following a shattering emotional breakdown, a college professor relocates to the countryside with his family. After a seemingly good start, he is plagued by spectral visions and investigates a local mystery that has put him and his family in danger.

Cast
Ed Stoppard as Ben Marshall
Sophia Myles as Rachel Marshall
Russell Tovey as Jack
Isaac Andrews as Harry Marshall
Paul Kaye as Father Patrick
Greg Wise as Dominic
Joanna Vanderham as Jessica
Sebastian Dunn as Dr. Parr
Duncan Pow as Lee
Luke Brandon Field as Jay
Harry Burton as Professor York
Alan Drake as Grimes
Eileen Nicholas as Olivia Warner

Reception
The film was generally not well received by critics and received a rating of 40% on Rotten Tomatoes.

References

External links
 

2013 films
Folk horror films
2010s English-language films